Two ships of the Royal Australian Navy (RAN) have been named HMAS Flinders, after Matthew Flinders.

 , a hydrographic survey ship in service from 1973 to 1998.
 , a  that is expected to enter service in the late 2020s.

See also
  was known as the Flinders Naval Depot until 1921

Royal Australian Navy ship names